The Killer Is Loose is a 1956 American crime film directed by Budd Boetticher and starring Joseph Cotten, Rhonda Fleming and Wendell Corey.

Plot
A savings and loan company is robbed by men displaying abnormal familiarity with the building. Police inquiries led by Lt. Sam Wagner (Joseph Cotten) discern that soft-spoken bank employee Leon Poole (Wendell Corey) is complicit in the crime. Poole starts a gunfight when the police appear at his apartment, but surrenders after Sam accidentally shoots and kills Poole's wife— in Poole's words, the only person who respected him and made his life worth living. The teller is sentenced to a decade in prison for his part in the robbery, promising that someday he will have revenge on Wagner.

Two years later, Sam has switched to a desk job at the behest of his wife Lila (Rhonda Fleming), who has feared his being killed on duty ever since she heard Poole threaten him. Poole, meanwhile, has been transferred to the prison’s honor farm for good behavior. His mild demeanor proves to be deceptive, and at the first opportunity he kills a guard and escapes. By the time the authorities discover his absence, Poole has also murdered a farmer, stolen the victim's truck and clothing, and driven towards the city where the Wagners live. He successfully passes through roadblocks and police patrols, having discovered that nobody recognizes him when he takes off his distinctive glasses. Sam is asked to resume active duty and help with the case.

Interviews with Poole's former cell mates make it clear that he is still obsessed with revenge, and that he plans to make Sam suffer by killing Lila. Sam sends Lila into hiding without explaining why, giving her the mistaken idea that he is selflessly using himself as bait to bring Poole into the open. Needing food and rest, Poole breaks into the home of his former army sergeant, Otto Flanders. Accustomed to bullying Poole during their military years, Flanders tries to intimidate the convict into surrendering. Poole kills him in cold blood, then leaves with a raincoat stolen from Flanders' wife.

Exasperated after an interval in hiding, Lila accuses Sam of preferring his job to her, and threatens to leave him. Sam does not take the threat seriously and continues to wait in his house, which has been made into a trap for Poole. A colleague's wife finally tells Lila about Poole’s real intentions, adding that all policemen’s families face emotional strain and Lila is not taking it as bravely as she should.

Ashamed, Lila leaves the hideout and walks home, wanting to reconcile with Sam whatever the risk. On her street Poole, disguised in the stolen raincoat, begins following her. Keeping her wits, she leads him into the police ambush and he is shot down. Sam and Lila embrace as the police gather around the corpse of Poole.

Cast
 Joseph Cotten as Det. Sam Wagner
 Rhonda Fleming as Lila Wagner
 Wendell Corey as Leon 'Foggy' Poole
 Alan Hale Jr. as Denny, Detective (as Alan Hale)
 Michael Pate as Det. Chris Gillespie
 John Larch as Otto Flanders
 Dee J. Thompson as Grace Flanders
 John Beradino as Mac, Plainclothes Cop
 Virginia Christine as Mary Gillespie
 Paul Bryar as Greg Boyd

Production
Budd Boetticher made the film with Lucien Ballard, who he called "the best cinematographer there ever was". They had made The Magnificent Matador and, Boetticher said, "when we got through with that, all the producers said, 'don't let these two guys make a picture together ever again; they're tough as Hell; they don't care about the money; they're going to break the studio.' I discovered that there was an eighteen-day picture called The Killer Is Loose at Warner Brothers, so Lucien and I went there and we made it in fifteen days. And that put that rumor to rest. Joseph Cotten was the star, a complete professional, always knew his lines."

Critical reaction
The New York Times film critic, Bosley Crowther, found nothing original about the film, calling the lead actors (Cotten and Corey) "first rate" and the crime film "third rate."

Critic Bruce Eder gave a more favorable review and wrote, "Budd Boetticher was a filmmaker of consummate skill and many surprises, as anyone who's seen his best Western dramas can attest. The Killer Is Loose (1956) only enhances his reputation in a totally unrelated genre, and in a stylistic mode that's about as far as he could get from his most familiar work. Using a cast of conventional—albeit top-flight—Hollywood professionals, Boetticher takes them out of the studio and puts them into an almost totally location-shot drama, and turns them loose in that naturalistic setting. The result is an array of performances that are as arresting as the script is filled with improbabilities; indeed, the narrative momentum of Boetticher's direction, coupled with a handful of excellent performances, overcomes a script that is just a little too heavy on coincidences to otherwise play true."

Critic Dennis Schwartz wrote, "A typical 1950s noir, distinguished by its rapid pace and taut script, that delves mainly into the character of the villain—making him out to be someone who went over-the-edge when he couldn't take being ridiculed as a failure, anymore...The suburban atmosphere and the no-nonsense style of telling the story add to the blandness of the story and the failure to elicit anything out of the ordinary to the build-up of the suspense that comes with the climax. The result is a watchable film which could be seen for the sense of nostalgia of the 1950s it evokes, a time when it was more receptive for noir to work as well as it does."

References

External links

 
 
 
 

1956 films
1950s crime thriller films
American crime thriller films
American black-and-white films
American films about revenge
Film noir
Films directed by Budd Boetticher
Films scored by Lionel Newman
United Artists films
1950s English-language films
1950s American films